S77 may refer to:
 , a submarine of the Israeli Navy
 Magee Airport, an airport in Idaho